Dr. Mihály Dömötör (1 October 1875 in Bíňovce – 2 February 1962) was a Hungarian politician, who served as Interior Minister for three months in 1920. His most famous order was the 1550/1920, which dissolved the freemason companies.

References
 Magyar Életrajzi Lexikon

1875 births
1962 deaths
People from Trnava District
Hungarian Interior Ministers